Andrew County Courthouse is a historic courthouse located at Savannah, Andrew County, Missouri. It was built in 1898, and is a two-story, Romanesque Revival style rectangular brick and stone building.  It projecting central entrance bay.  It features a three-story clock tower with an octagonal ogee roof and similarly roofed smaller corner towers.

It was listed on the National Register of Historic Places in 1980.

References

Clock towers in Missouri
County courthouses in Missouri
Courthouses on the National Register of Historic Places in Missouri
Romanesque Revival architecture in Missouri
Government buildings completed in 1898
Buildings and structures in Andrew County, Missouri
National Register of Historic Places in Andrew County, Missouri